This article details Crewe Alexandra's 2011–12 season in League Two. This will be Crewe's 88th competitive season in the English Football League and third successive in League Two.

Players

Squad information 

Appearances (starts and substitute appearances) and goals include those in the League (and playoffs), FA Cup, League Cup and Football League Trophy.

Squad stats

Appearances and goals

|-
|colspan="14"|Players on loan to Crewe who returned to their parent club:

|}

Top scorers
Source:

1Includes 2012 Football League play-offs.

Disciplinary record

Awards

Individual

Club

Players in and out

In

Out

Club

Coaching staff

Other information

Kits

Competitions

Overall

League Two

Table

Results summary

Results by round

Matches

Pre-Season Friendlies 

Last updated: 4 May 2011

League Two

Football League Cup 

Last updated: 1 July 2011

Football League Trophy

FA Cup 

Last updated: 12 November 2011

References 
The following references are from crewealex.net, unless otherwise specified.

External links 
 Official Website
 Sky Sports
 BBC Football

Crewe Alexandra
Crewe Alexandra F.C. seasons